Jeremy James Geathers (June 19, 1986 – February 11, 2017) was an American football player. He was signed by the New Orleans Saints of the National Football League as an undrafted free agent in 2008. He played college football at Nevada-Las Vegas.

Early life
Geathers attended Andrews High School in Andrews, South Carolina.

College career
After his high school graduation, Geathers attended Butler Community College in El Dorado, Kansas. While at Butler, Geathers was a member of the Grizzlies football team.

Geathers spent two seasons playing for the UNLV Rebels before forgoing his final season of eligibility to enter the 2008 NFL Draft.

Professional career

Return to the Shock
Geathers returned to the Shock in 2013 and 2014.

Orlando Predators
On October 27, 2014, Geathers was assigned to the Orlando Predators.

Death
Geathers was killed as he tried to cross a street and was struck by a limousine on February 11, 2017, in Las Vegas. Geathers was reportedly not at an intersection or marked crosswalk when the incident occurred.

References

External links

Toronto Argonauts profile page
ArenaFans.com page
New Orleans Saints bio
UNLV Rebels bio

1986 births
2017 deaths
American football defensive ends
Butler Grizzlies football players
UNLV Rebels football players
New Orleans Saints players
Spokane Shock players
Chicago Rush players
BC Lions players
Toronto Argonauts players
Orlando Predators players
Players of American football from New Orleans
Players of Canadian football from New Orleans
Road incident deaths in Nevada
Pedestrian road incident deaths
Geathers family